Lokivetmab, trade name Cytopoint, is a monoclonal antibody used to treat atopic dermatitis in dogs. It acts against interleukin 31 (IL-31), which is a cytokine involved in causing itchiness (pruritus). Lokivetmab is administered by subcutaneous injection; each dose is effective for four to eight weeks.

The United States Department of Agriculture (USDA) approved lokivetmab (manufactured by Zoetis and sold under the trade name Cytopoint) in December 2016, and it was approved by the European Medicines Agency in 2017. Lokivetmab was the first monoclonal antibody to be approved for use in animals in the European Union.

References

External links 
 

Monoclonal antibodies
Dog medications